Afmadow is a city in southern Somalia, located in the middle of the Juba region and bordered by Kenya, Badhadhe, Kismayo, Jamame, Jilib, Hagar, Bardhere and Elwaq in Somalia, 401 km southwest of the capital Mogadishu. It is home to a wide variety of wild animals, including the Big Five game. The vegetation in Afmadow consists of rich grassland, bounded by semi-desert. It is located northwest of Kismayo. Distance between Afmadow and Kismayo is 110 kilometers or 68 miles. the majority clans in Afmadow are the Ogaden and Wardey cali

Divisions 
 Waamo
 Faanoole
 Danwadaag

Sub-Divisions 
 Bulowein
 Bulo-Dano
 Abaq-Baanboow
 Adablaha
 Hodan
 Afarsaha
 Cameroon
 Barxada
 Baldoos
 Adoole
 Bulo-Gumar

History 
The town was captured in 2006 by the Islamic Court Union as were the other districts in the region during the civil war.

On 21 November 2009, the Islamist Al-Shabab militia took control of Afmadow, causing hundreds of families and also western aid workers to flee in fear of violence, after another Islamist group, Hizbul Islam, left a day earlier, allowing Al-Shabab to move in without much resistance.

Tension had been building between both militia since the former allies fell out in October in Kismayo, leading to fighting and Al-Shabab taking Kismayo in October 2009.

On 18 October 2011, eyewitnesses reported that Kenyan jets were flying low over the city and al-Shabab was preparing entrenchment systems to defend against an expected attack by the Kenya Army as part of the Kenyan intervention in Somalia. But at the time, the government in Mogadishu was denying the presence of Kenyan troops in Somalia.

On 31 May 2012, it was reported that the Jubaland security forces backed KDF captured the city, as al-Shabab abandoned the town without fighting.

References

Populated places in Lower Juba